Microcapnolymma angustata is a species of beetle in the family Cerambycidae, and the only species in the genus Microcapnolymma. It was described by Pic in 1928.

References

Dorcasominae
Beetles described in 1928
Monotypic beetle genera